Sorlada is a town and municipality located in the province and autonomous community of Navarre, northern Spain. According to 2017 census, it had 52 inhabitants.

References

External links
 SORLADA in the Bernardo Estornés Lasa - Auñamendi Encyclopedia (Euskomedia Fundazioa) 
 

Municipalities in Navarre